The 112th district of the Texas House of Representatives contains parts of Dallas, Richardson, Garland, Sachse, Rowlett, and Sunnyvale. The current Representative is Angie Chen Button, who has represented the district since 2009.

References 

112